The second season of The L Word originally aired on Showtime from February 20, 2005 to May 15, 2005 and featured 13 episodes. It starts by unveiling to the viewers a secret Tina is keeping from everyone: she successfully became impregnated after a second insemination. Tina and Bette are still apart. Bette doesn't deny the affair and begs Tina for forgiveness but later alienates herself from the group and continues the affair for a short while until realizing that it's Tina she wants to spend her life with, not Candace and so ends their short affair. Tina begins seeing Helena, while Bette’s life is portrayed as a wreck, with alcohol abuse, problems with her job, the death of her father and being fired during the season finale. Tina and Bette reconcile during the final episode. The character of Marina was written out of the show and the Planet was bought by Kit Porter.

Cast and characters

Episodes

References

External links

The L Word
2005 American television seasons